Todd Marshall (born 8 October 1998) is an Australian rules footballer playing for the Port Adelaide Football Club in the Australian Football League (AFL). He is a tall key-position player.

Early life
Marshall grew up in Deniliquin, New South Wales. As a teenager he was a talented cricket player, touring England with NSW youth teams. He made the decision to focus on football at a relatively late age, playing his first full TAC Cup season with the Murray Bushrangers in 2016. Marshall also represented NSW/ACT at the 2016 AFL Under 18 Championships. He fell into Greater Western Sydney Giants' recruitment zone in the Riverina and was briefly part of its academy, but in May 2016 the AFL ruled that Marshall had not spent enough time at the club and thus would have to go through the normal draft process rather than going straight to GWS as an academy player.

AFL career
Marshall was drafted by Port Adelaide with their first selection and sixteenth overall in the 2016 national draft. Todd Marshall was good friends with Patrick Ryder during his tenure at Port Adelaide and when the latter was traded to St Kilda at the end of the 2019 AFL season the former changed his guernsey number from 13 to 4.

The 2022 season proved to be Marshall's best yet, playing in 21 of 22 games and kicking a career high 45 goals to be Port Adelaide's leading goalkicker.

Personal life
Marshall lost both of his parents within six months at the age of 19.

Statistics
Statistics are correct to the end of round 20 2022.

|-
| scope="row" text-align:center |2017
| 
| 13 || 3 || 1 || 2 || 15 || 11 || 26 || 10 || 10 || 0.3 || 0.7 || 5.0 || 3.7 || 8.7 || 3.3 || 3.3 || 0
|-style="background:#EAEAEA"
| scope="row" text-align:center | 2018
| 
| 13 || 7 || 11 || 7 || 40 || 20 || 60 || 16 || 12 || 1.6 || 1.0 || 5.7 || 2.9 || 8.6 || 2.3 || 1.7 || 0
|- 
| scope="row" text-align:center | 2019
| 
| 13 || 10 || 10 || 4 || 68 || 26 || 94 || 35 || 23 || 1.0 || 0.4 || 6.8 || 2.6 || 9.4 || 3.5 || 2.3 || 0
|-style="background:#EAEAEA"
| scope="row" text-align:center | 2020
| 
| 4 || 14 || 11 || 9 || 84 || 27 || 111 || 41 || 35 || 0.7 || 0.6 || 6.0 || 1.9 || 7.9 || 2.9 || 2.5 || 0
|- 
| scope="row" text-align:center | 2021
| 
| 4 || 21 || 24 || 12 || 159 || 55 || 214 || 85 || 27 || 1.1 || 0.5 || 7.5 || 2.6 || 10.1 || 4.0 || 1.2 || 0
|- 
| scope="row" text-align:center | 2022
| 
| 4 || 19 || 39 || 13 || 163 || 33 || 196 || 98 || 43 || 2.0 || 0.6 || 8.5 || 1.7 || 10.3 || 5.1 || 2.2 || 0
|- class="sortbottom"
! colspan=3 | Career
! 74
! 96
! 47
! 529
! 172
! 701
! 285
! 150
! 1.2
! 0.6
! 7.1
! 2.3
! 9.4
! 3.8
! 2.0
! 0
|}

References

External links

1998 births
Living people
Port Adelaide Football Club players
Port Adelaide Football Club players (all competitions)
Murray Bushrangers players
Australian rules footballers from New South Wales
People from Deniliquin